Boris Hüttenbrenner (born September 23, 1985) is a former Austrian professional association football player. He played as a midfielder.

References

1985 births
Living people
Austrian footballers
Association football midfielders
DSV Leoben players
SK Austria Klagenfurt players
Kapfenberger SV players
Wolfsberger AC players
Austrian Football Bundesliga players